William Heath was elected to the House of Assembly of Jamaica in 1820. His other biographical details are uncertain.

References 

Year of birth missing
Members of the House of Assembly of Jamaica
Year of death missing